The Embassy of the Russian Federation in Islamabad is the diplomatic mission of Russia to Pakistan. There is a consulate general in Karachi, and an honorary consul is based in Lahore.

Overview

The first Russian embassy was established in Karachi on 1 May 1948 with the beginning of diplomatic relations with Pakistan. In August 1960 the capital was moved from Karachi to Islamabad, with the embassy in Karachi becoming a consulate-general, while a new embassy was established in Islamabad.

See also
 Russians in Pakistan

References

External links
Embassy of Russia in Islamabad

Islamabad
Russia
Pakistan–Russia relations
Pakistan–Soviet Union relations